Wabamun may refer to:

Wabamun, Alberta, a hamlet in Alberta, Canada
Wabamun Lake, a lake in Alberta, Canada
Wabamun Indian Reserve No. 133A, on the east shore of Wabamun Lake
Wabamun Indian Reserve No. 133B, on the east shore of Wabamun Lake
Wabamun Lake Provincial Park, located on the north-eastern shore of Wabamun Lake
Wabamun Formation, a stratigraphical unit of Famennian age in the Western Canadian Sedimentary Basin
Wabamun Generating Station, a coal-fired plant that was located next to the village of Wabamun
Kapasiwin, Alberta, formerly known as Wabamun Beach